Lyuben Berov (6 October 1925 – 7 December 2006) was a Bulgarian economist. He served as Prime Minister of Bulgaria in the 83rd Government of Bulgaria from 30 December 1992 to 17 October 1994.

Berov was born in Sofia, studied economics, and worked as an advisor to President Zhelyu Zhelev, the country's first non-Communist president.

See also   
List of foreign ministers in 1993 
 Foreign relations of Bulgaria
List of Bulgarians
 History of Bulgaria since 1989

References

External links

 

1925 births
2006 deaths
Politicians from Sofia
Prime Ministers of Bulgaria
20th-century Bulgarian economists
Corresponding Members of the Bulgarian Academy of Sciences